The Psions are a fictional extraterrestrial species in the DC Universe. The Psions first appeared in Tales of the New Teen Titans (vol. 1) #4 (September 1982) and were created by Marv Wolfman and George Pérez. The earliest uncredited appearance of the Psions was in The Witching Hour #13 (March 1971) written by Marv Wolfman.

Fictional biography

Origins
Billions of years ago, on the planet Maltus, the Maltusian immortals studied all aspects of life. They took a local reptile for testing and discovered one part of the lizard's mind had the potential for much greater complexity. They enhanced the creatures and found the new developments were passed to each succeeding generation. The reptiles were released back into the wild to chart their survival rate.

The Maltusians eventually left their world in a great exodus. The enhanced reptiles evolved into the Psion race. The early Psions investigated the Maltusian labs and mimicked their creators. They went as far as cutting off their tails to look more like the Maltusians (and, as a result, disavowing their original background). After several millennia, the Psions left Maltus to follow their creators, now known as the Guardians of the Universe, who were on Oa.

When the two discovered each other, things were not quite what the Psions expected. The Oans regretted their decision not to destroy their equipment before leaving Maltus. The Psions wished to learn more from the Guardians, but were forbidden to travel to Oa. Though the Psions had mastered the technology, they had gained little understanding. The Guardians felt responsible for the Psions and sent them to a distant galaxy where they could strive for comprehension. The Guardians ordered the Psions to stay within their assigned area so they would not be disturbed. The Guardians hoped the Psions would achieve their own greatness. The Green Lantern Corps would not be allowed to interfere with the Psions as part of the process. The Guardians' great hope has not come to fruition.

Discovering their creators and then feeling humiliated by the same, the Psions buried the truth. As a species they forgot their background and began anew their scientific work. As scientists, the Psions asked the questions all thinkers ask, such as "Where are we from?" Again and again, the Psions discovered the truth about their origins, and every time they suppressed the knowledge. The Psions refuse to acknowledge that their creators did not want them or believe in them. When hearing the truth, in pain, they go into shock and incapacitate themselves. This process also suppresses their knowledge of their genesis.

Invasion
The Psions were among the many alien races that took part in invading Earth after the Dominators became worried about humanity's ability to produce super-powered individuals. Part of their contribution to the war effort included creating sedatives for prisoners in the gulag that the Alliance maintained in deep space. A science team also worked out of Alliance Headquarters in conquered Australia. This team was killed when an effort to send a bomb through a JLI transporter backfired.

A Psion was part of the Paradocs crew during the Our Worlds at War crossover. While helping tend to a gravely injured Wonder Woman, he openly stated she was most likely beyond saving and that he should start dissecting her. Fortunately, Hippolyta took over treatment for her daughter.

Current status
The Psions maintain vast floating laboratories where studies continue. There they exploit the life forms they found in the Vegan star system, often performed with a sadistic enthusiasm. For instance, when they captured the Tamaranians, Komand'r and Koriand'r, the Psions subjected them to a torturous experiment to test the upper limit of their species' innate ability to absorb solar radiation before their bodies exploded with the overload. While the Tamaranians endured the increasing agony of this experiment, the Psions took wagers as to their physical reactions until an attack by Komand'r's forces began to rescue her. While the Psions were distracted by this, Koriand'r managed to free herself and her sister with a new ability gained from this intense energy bombardment, the ability to project destructive energy from their hands at will (called "starbolts").

Working with their science, the Psions created the many species of Vega's twenty-five worlds, subconsciously replicating their own origins. Active against them are the Omega Men, an interstellar group of rebels drawn from the Vegan worlds. Psion experiments accidentally created the Vegan goddess X'Hal. The Green Lantern Corps has been barred from entering or interfering within the Vegan star system due to an ancient pact with the Spider Guild. However, the fourth law of the rewritten book of Oa by the Guardians of the Universe states that the Vega System is no longer outside of Green Lantern Corps' jurisdiction.

Green Lanterns Kyle Rayner and Guy Gardner planned to breach Vegan space in order to retrieve recruit Soranik Natu. The mission was successful, thanks to the skills shown by Soranik, leading to the defeat of the Spider Guild.

In other media

Miscellaneous
 The Psions appear in Batman: The Brave and the Bold issue #12. Batman and Adam Strange team up to save Rann and Christmas from them.

References

DC Comics alien species
Fictional reptilians